The Lady Carling Eastern Open was a golf tournament on the LPGA Tour from 1962 to 1966 played at the Pleasant Valley Country Club in Sutton, Massachusetts, United States.

Winners
Lady Carling Open
1966 Kathy Whitworth

Lady Carling Eastern Open
1965 No tournament
1964 Mickey Wright
1963 Shirley Englehorn (2)

Eastern Open
1962 Shirley Englehorn

See also
Lady Carling Open - another LPGA Tour event, played in Maryland from 1964 to 1973
Danbury Lady Carling Open - another LPGA Tour event, played in Connecticut in 1969

References

1962 establishments in Massachusetts
1966 disestablishments in Massachusetts
Former LPGA Tour events
Golf in Massachusetts
History of Worcester County, Massachusetts
Recurring sporting events established in 1962
Recurring sporting events disestablished in 1966
Sports competitions in Massachusetts
Sports in Worcester County, Massachusetts
Sutton, Massachusetts
Tourist attractions in Worcester County, Massachusetts
History of women in Massachusetts